The 2021–22 Pacific Tigers men's basketball team represented the University of the Pacific during the 2021–22 NCAA Division I men's basketball season. The Tigers were led by first-year head coach Leonard Perry and played their home games at the Alex G. Spanos Center in Stockton, California as members of the West Coast Conference.

Previous season 
The Tigers finished the 2020–21 season 9–9, 6–7 in WCC play to finish in fifth place. They lost in the second round of the WCC tournament to Santa Clara.

On March 5, Stoudamire left to join the coaching staff of the Boston Celtics after 5 seasons and was replaced by top assistant Leonard Perry on July 7.

Offseason

Departures

Incoming transfers

Recruiting Class of 2021

Roster

Schedule and results

|-
!colspan=9 style=| Regular season

|-
!colspan=9 style=| WCC tournament

Source:

References

Pacific Tigers men's basketball seasons
Pacific
Pacific
Pacific